Old Order may refer to:

 Old Order Anabaptism, a conservative late 19th century Christian movement among the Amish and other Anabaptist groups.
 Ancien Régime, a term for the aristocratic system before the French Revolution.
 Old Order (Star Wars), the political system of the Old and New Republics and the Galactic Federation of Free Alliances
 The Old Order: Stories of the South, a 1955 collection of short fiction by Katherine Anne Porter

See also 
 New World Order (disambiguation)
 New Order (disambiguation)